

The system
Incomplete System

Below shows how the current system works. For each division, its official name and number of clubs is given. Each division promotes to the division(s) that lie directly above it and relegates to the division(s) that lie directly below it: